Kanayi Kunhiraman (born 25 July 1937) is an Indian sculptor, best known for his outsize sculptures such as Yakshi of Malampuzha Dam Gardens, Sagarakanyaka at Shankumugham Beach and Mukkola Perumal trinity in Kochi. Taught by K. C. S. Paniker, he is a former chairman of the Lalit Kala Academy, India's national academy of fine arts. The Government of Kerala awarded him the inaugural Raja Ravi Varma Award in 2005. He is also a recipient of the Thikkurissy Award and the inaugural MS Nanjunda Rao National Award of the Karnataka Chitrakala Parishath. In 2022, he was honoured with Kerala Sree Award, third highest civilian award given by the Government of Kerala.

Biography 

Kunhiraman was born on 25 July 1937 at Kuttamath in Hosdurg Taluk of Kanhangad in Kasaragod District of the south Indian state of Kerala. After early schooling at the local schools in Kuttamath and Puthaott, he joined Raja's high school, Nileshwaram to pass the Secondary School Leaving Certificate examination in 1957. A teacher at his school, by name Krishnan Kutty, encouraged him to pursue his artistic interests but he did not get encouragement from his family which forced him to flee home to Chennai where he studied sculpture at the Government College of Fine Arts, Chennai. It was during his days here, Kunhiraman had the opportunity to come in contact with K. C. S. Paniker who was a faculty and later, the principal of the institution. After completing the course, he worked as a part-time teacher at Ethiraj College for Women from 1961 but when he received the Commonwealth Scholarship, he moved to England to study at the Slade School of Fine Art in 1965; he spent three years at the school. On his return to Kerala, he undertook a number of assignments and in 1976, he was invited to head the department of sculpture of the College of Fine Arts Trivandrum; he would also serve the institution as its principal until 1978 when he was nominated as the chair of the Kerala Lalithakala Akademi; he would also chair the academy again in 2001.

Kunhiraman is married to Nalini.

Legacy 

On his return to Kerala from Chennai, Kunhiraman was commissioned by the irrigation department of Kerala, on recommendation from K. C. S. Paniker, for an art work to be installed at the Malampuzha dam garden and he created Yakshi, a  statue of a naked woman, sitting on the lawns; the sensuality of the sculpture drew protests from traditionalists. Two years later, he was invited by the Greater Cochin Development Authority (GCDA) for two sculptures in the premises of their new office in Kadavanthra and he created Environmental Pieces  and Mukkola Perumal, both concrete sculptures. He also created a sculpture, Fertility at Ambalamedu premises of the Fertilisers and Chemicals Travancore. In 1990, he completed the Jalakanyaka (Mermaid), a  sculpture at Shankumugham Beach, in Thiruvananthapuram;  The beach also has another of his sculptures titled, Snake.

The bronze bust of K. P. P. Nambiar, the Padma Bhushan winning technocrat, and the bust of K. C. Mammen Mappillai are two conventional sculptures created by Kunhiraman. Amma in Payyambalam, Akshara Shilpam in Kottayam, Conch, Seats, Nandi and Embrace at Veli Tourist Village, are some of his other works. Melathara and Kalithara, dedicated to public with the accompaniment from a violin concert by L. Athira Krishna in Kollam in 2008. and the Aksharashilpam, at the premises of the public library in Kottayam feature among his more recent works. He has also published on poetry anthology, titled, Kānāyi Kuñhirāmant̲e Kavitakaḷ.

Awards and honours 
Kunhiraman, who has designed many of the statuettes for various awards in Kerala, was selected by Kerala Lalithakala Akademi for their annual award, Raja Ravi Varma Award, in 2005, making him the first sculptor to receive the honour. He received the Thikkurissy Award in 2006 and Karnataka Chitrakala Parishath awarded him the inaugural MS Nanjunda Rao National Award for Art in 2018. Lalit Kala Akademi, the national academy of India for fine arts, published a book on Kunhiraman's works in 2008. In 2011, he received the T. K. Ramakrishnan Award instituted by Abu Dhabi Sakthi Theatres for his overall contribution. He was conferred the Kerala Sree award instituted by Government of Kerala in 2022.

Selected works

Books on Kanayai Kunhiraman

Gallery

References

External links

 
 

Malayali people
Living people
Alumni of the University of London
1937 births
Government College of Fine Arts, Chennai alumni
Indian male sculptors
People from Kasaragod district
Artists from Kerala
20th-century Indian sculptors
21st-century Indian sculptors
Indian contemporary sculptors
20th-century Indian male artists
21st-century Indian male artists
Kerala Sree Award Winners
Recipients of the Abu Dhabi Sakthi Award